Andrea Laura Barber (born July 3, 1976) is an American actress. She is known for playing Kimmy Gibbler in the ABC sitcom Full House and the Netflix sequel series Fuller House.

Early life
Barber is the youngest of three children. She graduated from La Serna High School in Whittier, California.  She earned a degree in English from Whittier College in 1999. Barber also has an MA in Women's Studies from the University of York, England. She returned to Whittier as assistant to the director of Whittier College's Office of International Programs.

Career
Barber's first major role was as the original Carrie Brady on the American soap opera Days of Our Lives, from 1982 to 1986. She also guest starred and starred in many movies and television series. Barber is known for her role on the sitcom Full House as Kimmy Gibbler, the best friend of D.J. Tanner, which she played from 1987 to 1995. She was at first a recurring role but shortly thereafter became a regular. After Full House ended, Barber retired from acting and started focusing on her personal life. In 2012, Barber reprised the role for a Funny or Die sketch called It's F*ckin Late alongside Dave Coulier, her former Full House co-star.

Barber reprised her role as Kimmy Gibbler in the Full House spin-off series Fuller House, along with Candace Cameron Bure and Jodie Sweetin. The series premiered on Netflix on February 26, 2016, and concluded on June 2, 2020, after five seasons. She plays Principal Willingham on the Nickelodeon series That Girl Lay Lay, which premiered on September 23, 2021.

Personal life
In 2002, Barber married Jeremy Rytky. The couple divorced in 2014. They have two children together.

Filmography

Awards and nominations

References

External links
 
 

20th-century American actresses
21st-century American actresses
Actresses from Los Angeles
Alumni of the University of York
American child actresses
American expatriates in Denmark
American expatriates in England
American film actresses
American soap opera actresses
American television actresses
Living people
Whittier College alumni
Whittier College faculty
1976 births
American women academics